The 2009 Tulsa mayoral election was held on November 10, 2009 to elect the mayor of Tulsa, Oklahoma. It resulted in the election of Dewey F. Bartlett Jr., the Republican candidate.

The stage for the 2009 election was set when incumbent Democratic mayor Kathy Taylor opted not to seek reelection. The primary election, held on September 8, 2009, resulted in the selection of state senator Tom Adelson as the Democratic nominee and Bartlett, a former councilman, as the Republican.  This led to a rematch of the 2004 state senate election in which Adelson defeated Bartlett.  Two independents were also on the ballot. Polling conducted a week before the primary gave Bartlett about a 10-point head-to-head lead over Adelson; and polling the week before the general election, which also included the independent candidates, showed an 8-point lead for Bartlett.

In the November 10 general election, Bartlett received about 45% of the vote to Adelson's 36% and 18% for independent Mark Perkins.  Adelson conceded early in the evening as the results became apparent. Bartlett took office on December 7, 2009.

Democratic primary

Candidates

Nominee
Tom Adelson, state senator, former Oklahoma Secretary of Health

Eliminated primary
Accountability Burns, perennial candidate
Prophet-Kelly Clark, perennial candidate
Robert Gwin Jr., perennial candidate
Paul Tay, perennial candidate

Results

Republican primary

Candidates

Nominee
Dewey F. Bartlett, Jr., former City Councilor

Eliminated in primary
Kevin Boggs
Nathaniel Booth
Anna Falling, former City Councilor
Chris Medlock, former City Councilor and 2006 mayoral Candidate
David O'Connor
Paul Alan Roales
Michael Lee Rush
Norris Streetman
John Porter Todd
Michael Tomes Sr.

Results

Independents

Candidates
Lawrence Kirkpatrick
Mark Perkins

General election

References

2009 Oklahoma elections
2009 United States mayoral elections
2009